Local elections were held in the United Kingdom in 1980. These were the first annual local elections for the new Conservative Prime Minister Margaret Thatcher. Though the Conservatives in government lost seats, the projected share of the vote was close: Labour Party 42%, Conservative Party 40%, Liberal Party 13%. Labour were still being led by the former prime minister James Callaghan, who resigned later in the year to be succeeded by Michael Foot.

Labour gained 601 seats, bringing their number of councillors to 8,011. The Conservatives lost 484 seats, leaving them with 11,738 councillors. The Liberal Party gained 90 seats and finished with 1,149 councillors.

Changes in control of councils were as follows:
Labour gain from no overall control: Amber Valley, Birmingham, Kirklees, Leeds, Peterborough, Rochdale, Walsall, Wolverhampton
Labour gain from Conservative: Bolton, Bradford, Hyndburn, Oldham, Oxford, Preston, Tamworth, Worcester
Conservative lose to no overall control: Calderdale, Daventry, Dudley, Great Yarmouth, Hastings, Rushmoor, Shrewsbury and Atcham, Weymouth and Portland
Liberal gain from Conservative: Adur
Independent gain from no overall control: Mole Valley

Summary of results

England

Metropolitan boroughs

Whole council
In 17 metropolitan boroughs the whole council was up for election.

In 17 boroughs there were new ward boundaries, following electoral boundary reviews by the Local Government Boundary Commission for England.

‡ New ward boundaries

Third of council
19 metropolitan borough councils had one third of their seats up for election.

District councils
In 103 districts one third of the council was up for election.

A further 59 councils had passed a resolution under section 7 (4) (b) of the Local Government Act 1972, requesting a system of elections by thirds. They could do so because they had had their new ward boundaries introduced at the 1979 elections.

‡ New ward boundaries

Scotland

District councils

References
Notes

Sources
Local elections 2006. House of Commons Library Research Paper 06/26.
Vote 1999 BBC News
Vote 2000 BBC News

 
Local elections